Jonathan Christopher Powell (born 13 June 1979) is a former English cricketer. Powell was a right-handed batsman who bowled right-arm off break. He was born at Harold Wood, Essex.

Powell made his debut for Essex in a List A match against Sussex in the 1996 AXA Equity and Law League. Following the 1996 season, he made Youth Test match debut England Under-19s against Pakistan Under-19s. He would go on to make five Youth Test appearances and nine Youth One Day International appearances between 1996 and 1998. His first-class debut for Essex came in the 1997 County Championship against Leicestershire, in what would be his only County Championship appearance. A further first-class appearances followed in February 1998 when he was called into the England A teams tour of Kenya and Sri Lanka, despite having played just the one first-class match. He appeared once on the tour against Sri Lanka A. No first-class appearances came in the 1998 English cricket season, it was in 1999 what he played his second and final first-class match for Essex against Cambridge University.

His three first-class matches bought him little success with the ball, with Powell taking just a single first-class wicket (that of Leicestershire's David Millns). Having made his debut for Essex in the List A format of the game, he went on to make five further appearances in that format, all of which came in the 1997 AXA Life League. He had a little more success with the ball in this format, claiming 4 wickets in his 6 matches at an average of 31.25, with best figures of 2/10.

Eventually leaving Essex at the end of the 2000 season, Powell played a single match for the Surrey Cricket Board in the 2001 MCCA Knockout Trophy against Oxfordshire. His brother, Mark, played List A cricket for Norfolk and the Minor Counties.

References

External links
Jonathan Powell at ESPNcricinfo
Jonathan Powell at CricketArchive

1979 births
Living people
People from Harold Wood
English cricketers
Essex cricketers
Surrey Cricket Board cricketers